478th may refer to:

478th Aeronautical Systems Wing (478 ASW), wing of the United States Air Force based out of Wright-Patterson Air Force Base, Ohio
478th Bombardment Squadron, inactive United States Air Force unit
478th Tactical Fighter Squadron, inactive United States Air Force unit

See also
478 (number)
478, the year 478 (CDLXXVIII) of the Julian calendar
478 BC